Peddler Creek is a stream in Gentry and Worth counties in the U.S. state of Missouri. It is a tributary of the Middle Fork of the Grand River.

The headwater region lies in Worth County midway between Worth and Denver. The stream flows south roughly parallel to and one mile east of U.S. Route 169. The confluence is approximately 1.5 miles southeast of Gentry in Gentry County.

According to tradition, Peddler Creek was named for an incident when a peddler was robbed by a party masquerading as Indians.

See also
List of rivers of Missouri

References

Rivers of Gentry County, Missouri
Rivers of Worth County, Missouri
Rivers of Missouri